Alan Carey may refer to:

 Alan Carey (canoeist) (born 1968), Irish sprint canoeist
 Alan Carey (mathematician); see Twisted K-theory
 Alan C. Carey (born 1962), American military aviation author and historian